Iwamoto (written:  or ) is a Japanese surname. Notable people with the surname include:

Aileen Iwamoto or Iwa Moto, Japanese-Filipina actress and model
, Japanese rower
Kaoru Iwamoto, Japanese professional Go player and teacher
, Japanese swimmer
Kim Coco Iwamoto, Japanese–American politician
, Japanese professional wrestler
, Japanese ice hockey player
Masayuki Iwamoto, astronomer
, Japanese modern pentathlete
, Japanese ice hockey player

Japanese-language surnames